Hardouinia is an extinct genus of echinoids that lived in the Late Cretaceous.  Its remains have been found in North America.

Sources

 Fossils (Smithsonian Handbooks) by David Ward (Page 182)

External links
Hardouinia in the Paleobiology Database

Prehistoric echinoid genera
Cretaceous echinoderms of North America
Cassiduloida